Groenbladia is a genus of green algae, specifically of the Desmidiaceae.

The genus name of Groenbladia is in honour of Rolf Leo Grönblad (1895-1962), who was a Finnish dentist and botanist (Algology), who worked in Finland.

The genus was circumscribed by Einar Johan Sigurd Teiling in Bot. Not. (1952) on page 275 in 1952.

References

External links

Scientific references

Scientific databases

 AlgaTerra database
 Index Nominum Genericorum

Desmidiaceae
Charophyta genera